Mandoki is a surname. Notable people with the surname include:

Leslie Mándoki (born 1953),  German-Hungarian musician
Luis Mandoki (born 1954), Mexican film director
Katya Mandoki (born 1947), Mexican women writer and artist